Evan Chevalier (born May 13, 1992) is a French footballer, who plays as a midfielder for Stade Bordelais.

Career 
Chevalier began his career on FC Girondins de Bordeaux. On 24 April 2011, he made his Ligue 1 debut, against AS Saint-Étienne. He then played for Bordeaux's B team, and on 2 July 2012, he was loaned to newly promoted Gazélec Ajaccio, in the second level. In January 2013, he returned to Bordeaux, and was named on the bench in the matches against Ajaccio and Sochaux.

References

External links

 

1992 births
Living people
People from Bruges, Gironde
French footballers
French expatriate footballers
Association football midfielders
FC Girondins de Bordeaux players
Gazélec Ajaccio players
Bergerac Périgord FC players
Vendée Poiré-sur-Vie Football players
Stade Bordelais (football) players
Ligue 1 players
Ligue 2 players
Championnat National players
Championnat National 2 players
Championnat National 3 players
Sportspeople from Gironde
French expatriate sportspeople in Australia
Expatriate soccer players in Australia
Footballers from Nouvelle-Aquitaine